The Place Where You Will Find Us is the debut album by the Belgian rock band Zornik. It was released in the year 2002.

Track listing
 "Hey Girl" - 4:15
 "Once Again" - 3:48
 "This Song Is Just For You" - 4:14
 "It's So Unreal" - 4:04
 "The Demons You Have Liked" - 3:52
 "Instru 7 Turns 15" - 3:12
 "You Move Me" - 3:52
 "Love Affair" - 3:44
 "Sometimes" -4:30
 "Wasting Time" - 5:00
 "Go Your Way" - 3:37
 "King Of The Town (Acoustic)" - 3:30
 "Hey Girl (Acoustic)" - 3:25

Singles
"Love Affair"
"It's So Unreal"
"Hey Girl"
"You Move Me"
"Sometimes"

Charts

Weekly charts

Year-end charts

References

2002 debut albums
Zornik albums